Fractal Analytics is a multinational artificial intelligence company that provides services in consumer packaged goods, insurance, healthcare, life sciences, retail and technology, and the financial sector. Headquartered in New York, it has a presence in the United States, United Kingdom, and India along with fifteen other locations.

History 
Fractal Analytics was founded in 2000 by Abhicine, Pranay Agrawal, Nirmal Palaparthi, Pradeep Suryanarayan and Ramakrishna Reddy. In 2005, the company established its base in the United States. In January 2015, it opened its office in Bengaluru, India. In 2015 they acquired Imagna Analytics and Mobius Innovations.

In 2016, Fractal Analytics appointed Pranay Agrawal as the CEO to replace co-founder Srikanth Velamakanni, the new Group Chief Executive and Executive Vice-Chairman. It also expanded its operations including the creation of two new subsidiaries Qure.ai and Cuddle.ai.

In August 2016, they partnered with KNIME, an open source data analytics. In June 2017, they acquired Chicago-based strategy & analytics firm, 4i Inc. In September 2017, they partnered with Final Mile to combine data science with behavioral science  In March 2018, Fractal Analytics acquired behavioural architecture company Final Mile. In January 2019, Fractal received a $200 Million funding from Apax Partners, a leading global private equity advisory firm.

References

Analytics companies
Companies established in 2000
Technology companies established in 2000
International information technology consulting firms